Fort York Armoury is a Canadian Forces facility located near the grounds of the Canadian National Exhibition in Toronto, Ontario, Canada. It is located at the intersection of Fleet Street and Fort York Boulevard, close to the historic Old Fort York in the neighbourhood of Fort York. It currently hosts several units of the Primary Reserve and the Canadian Cadet Organization.

History

The Armoury was built in 1933 with private funds and boasts the largest lattice wood arched roof in Canada. It was designed by Toronto architects Marani, Lawson and Morris. Fort York Armoury has been designated a recognized Federal Heritage building since 1991.

Toronto Transit Commission service is provided by the 509 Harbourfront and the 511 Bathurst streetcar lines.

Architecture

There are three small regimental museums within the armoury. Overlooking Lake Ontario there are a series of regimental officers' messes. These are excellent examples of the traditional British form. The exceptional architectural feature of Fort York Armoury is a Lamella roof. It provides an uninterrupted span of nearly 125 feet, roofing for parades, military vehicles and the training of soldiers.  The main entrance to the armoury has pilasters of rusticated masonry with a large carved coat-of-arms. This is the coat-of-arms of the Dominion of Canada.  It appears above the flat keyed arch of the entrance. The cap badges of each original regiment are carved in stone set in the parapet over doorways opening to ornamental iron balconies.

Lodger units
In the Canadian Forces, an armoury is a place where a reserve unit trains, meets, and parades. The Armoury is currently home to:
Queen's York Rangers
The Royal Regiment of Canada
32 Signal Regiment (formerly 709 (Toronto) Communication Regiment)
32 Brigade Battle School

Former units:
The Toronto Scottish Regiment
2 Field Engineer Regiment
1st Battalion Irish Regiment
The 48th Highlanders of Canada

See also
 List of Armouries in Canada
 Denison Armoury
 Moss Park Armoury
 Toronto Armories

References

Armouries in Canada
Buildings and structures in Toronto
Heritage sites in Ontario
1933 establishments in Ontario
Government buildings completed in 1933
Royal Regiment of Canada
Queen's York Rangers (1st American Regiment)